Yisa Yu or Yu Kewei (born 23 October 1983), is a Chinese singer. She started out singing in bars and participated in several singing competitions. Her career took off after she achieved fourth place nationally in the 2009 season of Hunan TV's Super Girl. Her fans are called Yu jin xiang (郁金香), which means "tulip"; personally named by Yisa.

Early life
Yu was born on 23 October 1983 as Yu Yingxia in Chengdu, Sichuan to parents working in the Chengdu Aircraft Industry Group. She studied English Language at the University of Electronic Science and Technology of China. She briefly took singing lessons at the insistence of her father but failed to complete. At college, Yu took part in a national singing competition for college students and defeated Li Yuchun to take the gold award.

Career
After her graduation, Yu worked in a company for a few months before leaving to become a singer at the famous Lianhua fudi music bar. During that time and before the 2009 Super Girl, She recorded several original songs and released three cover albums.

In 2005 Yu auditioned, and failed, for the Chengdu Super Girl competition. The following year she auditioned again, only to fail once more. Not content with the result, she traveled to Guangzhou to enter the local competition, where she reached the last 20 before being eliminated. Her third try, in 2009, finally landed her among the winners at Chengdu to qualify to the national Super Girl. There she won the first game of the top ten to feature on the cover of Elle magazine and in the Cover Girls compilation album released by the competition. Then she was able to reach the top four before being eliminated.

Soon after the competition ended, Yu was invited to record the theme song for The King of Milu Deer, China's first 3D animated film. Then she became the first of her Super Girl peers to be selected by a label, when she signed with Rock Records on 8 December 2009. The Taiwanese label immediately announced that they have assembled a team of top producers to work on her first original album. That album was released in May 2010, titled Blue Shorts. In the latter part of the year she featured on the OST of the hit Taiwanese drama The Fierce Wife, and took part in a series of concerts to celebrate the 30th anniversary of Rock Records.

In 2011 Yu was nominated for the 22nd Golden Melody Award in the "Best New Artist" category. That caused controversy however, as she had cover albums released in mainland China before 2010, which would make her ineligible for the "new artist" category if they were released in Taiwan. She was eventually disqualified. In a statement, she respected the decision of the judge panels and said: "I would like to thank the Golden Melody Awards for the recognition the judges have given me. Although I was disqualified, it has inspired me to work harder in the future."

Yu's second album, Wei Jia Xing Fu (meaning "add a little happiness"), was released in June 2011. She continued the collaboration with big names in Taiwanese music. The most prominent was famous rocker Wu Bai. Several songs from this album were featured on the sound track of yet another popular drama, Office Girls.

The summer of 2012 saw the release of a third album, Lost Love. One of the songs (幸福難不難/"Happiness is hard") was also the theme song for the movie version of The Fierce Wife, which was released around the same time. In 2020, she participated in Sisters Who Make Waves.

Discography

Movie/drama soundtracks

Cover albums
First two albums were released under her real name, Yu Ying Xia (郁英霞).

Awards

References

1983 births
Living people
Chinese Mandopop singers
Singers from Chengdu
21st-century Chinese women singers